The 1917 Vanderbilt Commodores football team represented Vanderbilt University in the 1917 college football season. The 1917 season was Dan McGugin's 14th year as head coach.

The south's first national champion Georgia Tech gave Vanderbilt its biggest loss in school history, 83 to 0. Vandy captain Alfred T. Adams praised the Tech team: "Tech's magnificent machine won easily over Vanderbilt. It was simply the matter of a splendid eleven winning over an unseasoned, inexperienced team. "Tech played hard, clean football, and we were somewhat surprised to meet such a fair, aggressive team, after the reports we had heard. I think that Vanderbilt could have broken that Tech shift if we had had last year's eleven. Being outweighed, Vanderbilt could not check the heavy forwards, or open up the line. Thereby hangs the tale."

Schedule

References

Vanderbilt
Vanderbilt Commodores football seasons
Vanderbilt Commodores football